Familie Merian is an Austrian television series.

See also 
 List of Austrian television series

External links 
 

Austrian television series
1980 Austrian television series debuts
1985 Austrian television series endings
1993 Austrian television series debuts
1993 Austrian television series endings
1980s Austrian television series
1990s Austrian television series
German-language television shows